Major-General Charles Ross (10 March 1864 – 21 December 1930), CB, DSO, was a British Army officer, active during the Boer War and the First World War, where he commanded 6th Division from 1915 to 1917. He was the younger brother of Sir Ronald Ross, who received the 1902 Nobel Prize in Medicine for discovering the method by which malaria was transmitted.

Early life
Ross was born in 1864, the third son of General Sir C. C. G. Ross. His eldest brother, Ronald, would later become a medical researcher, and was eventually awarded the 1902 Nobel Prize in Medicine for his work on the transmission of malaria.

He was educated at Stubbington, and joined the Norfolk Regiment (later the Royal Norfolk Regiment) in 1884. He was attached to the Egyptian Army in 1893 and 1894, and attended the Staff College, Camberley from 1897 to 1899. Shortly after leaving, he was posted to South Africa, following the outbreak of hostilities there, to act as a divisional signalling officer. He was then assigned to intelligence work on the staff, and remained in the country until July 1902, being mentioned in dispatches and awarded the Distinguished Service Order. In 1904 he was posted to the Royal Military Academy, Woolwich, as an instructor, and in 1905 was transferred to the Royal Military College, Sandhurst as the commander of a cadet company. He remained at Sandhurst until January 1908, when he was posted to the Staff College as an instructor; he was well regarded as a lecturer by his students.

First World War
During the early stages of the war, Ross commanded a brigade.

On 14 November 1915, he was appointed to command the 6th Division in the place of Walter Congreve, who had been promoted to command a corps. He commanded the division during the Battle of the Somme, where it was engaged in September and October 1916. He held command until 18 August 1917, when he was relieved. Whilst commanding the division, he was made a Companion of the Bath. He subsequently commanded the 69th (2nd East Anglian) Division in the UK.

Later life
Ross wrote three books stemming from his academic work: Representative Government and War (1904); The Problem of National Defence (1907); and An Outline of the Russo-Japanese War 1904–1905 (1912). He also wrote fiction, publishing at five mystery novels: The Fly-By-Nights; The Haunted Seventh; Every Man's Hand; When the Devil Was Sick; and The Castle Fenham Case.

He married Clara Marion Horton, the widow of an officer in the Royal Artillery, in 1905; they had no children.

Notes

Bibliography
 

|-

1864 births
1930 deaths
British Army major generals
British Army generals of World War I
Royal Norfolk Regiment officers
British military writers
20th-century British novelists
Graduates of the Staff College, Camberley
British Army personnel of the Second Boer War
Companions of the Distinguished Service Order
People educated at Stubbington House School
British male novelists
20th-century British male writers
Academics of the Royal Military College, Sandhurst
Academics of the Royal Military Academy, Woolwich
Academics of the Staff College, Camberley